Carolyn L. Mazloomi (née Carolyn Louise Stewart; born August 22, 1948) is an American curator, quilter, author, art historian, and aerospace engineer. She is a strong advocate for presenting and documenting African-American-made quilts. Her own quilts are designed to tell complex stories around African-American heritage and contemporary experiences.

Life
Carolyn Louise Stewart was born in 1948 in Baton Rouge, Louisiana, to a family of amateur artists and painters. She graduated from Northrop University in Inglewood, California, and worked in Los Angeles as an aerospace engineer.

In the early 1970s, she encountered an Appalachian quilt at a market in Dallas that began her passion for quilting. She continued her quilting experiments while earning her PhD in aerospace engineering from the University of Southern California (USC) Viterbi School of Engineering in 1984.

Mazloomi is has since retired from her job as an aerospace engineer and Federal Aviation Administration crash site investigator. She is married to Iranian engineer Rezvan Mazloomi, and together the family lives in Ohio.

Women of Color Quilters Network
In the mid-1980s after trying unsuccessfully to expand her small Los Angeles-based African-American quilting circle, Mazloomi placed an advertisement in Quilter's Newsletter Magazine requesting correspondence with other quilters who shared this frustration. Her advertisement and the resulting correspondence led to the formation of the Women of Color Quilters Network (WOCQN) in 1986, a national organization of 1,700 members.

Founding members of the WOCQN included Mazloomi, Claire E. Carter, aRma Carter, Cuesta Benberry, Meloydy Boyd, Michael Cummings, Peggie Hartwell, and Marie Wilson.

Quilting
Mazloomi works in narrative quilts that tell stories through visuals. Common themes include music, inspired by an aunt who owned a Louisiana juke joint, and the African-American experience during the Civil Rights Movement.

Mazloomi currently serves on the board of directors of the Alliance for American Quilts.

Works authored on quilting
 Spirits of the Cloth: Contemporary African American Quilts (1998). 
 Threads of Faith: Recent Works from the Women of Color Quilters Network (2004). 
 Textural Rhythms: Quilting the Jazz Tradition (2007). 
 Quilting African American Women's History Our Challenges, Creativity and Champions (2008). 
 The Journey of Hope in America: Quilts Celebrating President Barack Obama (2009).

Awards
In 1999 she was awarded the Black Caucus of the American Library Association Literary Award for Best Nonfiction book, for her work Spirits of the Cloth: Contemporary African American Quilts.
In 2003 Dr. Mazloomi was awarded the first Ohio Heritage Fellowship Award.
In 2014 Dr. Mazloomi was a recipient of a National Heritage Fellowship, specifically the Bess Lomax Hawes Award, bestowed by the National Endowment for the Arts, which is the United States government's highest honor in the folk and traditional arts.

References

External links
 
 WorldCat Catalog of Works by or about Carolyn Mazloomi 
 Women of Color Quilters Network
 2015 NEA podcast

African-American women artists
American art historians
Quilters
1948 births
Living people
Women art historians
Northrop University alumni
American women historians
20th-century American women writers
21st-century American women writers
Artists from Baton Rouge, Louisiana
American aerospace engineers
American women engineers
Engineers from Louisiana
20th-century American engineers
21st-century American engineers
Federal Aviation Administration personnel
USC Viterbi School of Engineering alumni
Writers from Baton Rouge, Louisiana
20th-century American historians
21st-century American historians
National Heritage Fellowship winners
20th-century women engineers
21st-century women engineers
Historians from Louisiana
20th-century African-American women writers
20th-century African-American writers
21st-century African-American women writers
21st-century African-American writers